Matthew Jay Hullum (born September 29, 1974) is an American director, producer, writer, actor and visual effects supervisor living in Austin, Texas. He is one of five co-founders and former CEO of production company Rooster Teeth, which specializes in online content, including live-action series, podcasts, animation and machinima, an art using game engines to create films.

Alongside longtime business partner Burnie Burns, he was named one of Variety's top Digital Entertainment Execs to Watch in 2018.

Early life
Matthew Jay Hullum was born in Atlanta, Georgia on September 29, 1974, to librarian Cheri Johnston (born 1945) and sports journalist and freelance writer Everett Hullum (1942–2015).

Career
Hullum met his production partner Burnie Burns while working at TSTV at the University of Texas at Austin. He recalled loving the creative freedom due to the lack of "gatekeepers" at the station. He would graduate with a Bachelor of Science in film.

Alongside Burns, he would direct, write and produce their directorial debut The Schedule (1997), starring his roommate Joel Heyman. He would go on to work as the visual effects coordinator for Hollywood films such as The Faculty and Driven.

Hullum voices Sarge in the Rooster Teeth original series Red vs. Blue, of which he also directs, produces and serves as casting director. He directed the science fiction comedy film Lazer Team, the first feature-length film Hullum has directed in over 18 years. Hullum co-wrote the film alongside Burnie Burns, Chris Demarais, and Josh Flanagan.

Hullum has directed four music videos for singles by the Barenaked Ladies, "Odds Are", "Did I Say That Out Loud?", "Say What You Want" and "Lookin' Up".

Personal life
Hullum married lawyer and actress Anna Hurayt on August 26, 2000. They live in Austin, Texas with their two children.

Filmography

Film

Television

Web

Video games

Music videos

References

External links
 
 

1974 births
Film producers from Texas
American animated film producers
American animated film directors
American male voice actors
American male web series actors
21st-century American male actors
Artists from Austin, Texas
American casting directors
Film directors from Texas
Living people
Male actors from Austin, Texas
Rooster Teeth people
Moody College of Communication alumni
TSTV alumni
Writers from Atlanta
Writers from Austin, Texas
Screenwriters from Texas
Screenwriters from Georgia (U.S. state)
21st-century American screenwriters